Great Oxendon is a linear village and civil parish in West Northamptonshire in England. At the time of the 2001 census, the parish's population was 307 people, increasing to 331 at the 2011 Census.

The villages name means 'oxen hill'.

Its eastern end is on the A508 road from Market Harborough to Northampton but most of the village is at 90° to the main road's north–south direction. The former railway tunnel at Great Oxendon is now open as part of the Brampton Valley Way.

Between 1859 and 1960 the village was served by Clipston and Oxendon railway station about one mile south-east of the village and with running trains between Northampton in the south and Market Harborough in the north.

Notable buildings
The Historic England website contains details of a total of four listed buildings in the parish of Great Oxendon, all of which are Grade II apart from St Helen's Church, which is Grade II*. They are:
St Helen's Church, Harborough Road
29 & 31 Main Street
45 Main Street and attached barn
Plum Tree Cottage, Main Street

See also 
Oxendon Rural District

References

External links 

Village website

Villages in Northamptonshire
West Northamptonshire District
Civil parishes in Northamptonshire